Lower Assendon  is a village in the Assendon valley in the Chiltern Hills, about  northwest of Henley-on-Thames in South Oxfordshire, England. The road between Henley and Wallingford passes the village. It was made into a turnpike in 1736 and ceased to be a turnpike in 1873. It is now classified the A4130. The village has a public house, The Golden Ball, that is now a gastropub. Henley Park is just east of the village. It was a medieval deer park and in 1300 became part of the manor of Henley. In the Georgian era the park was converted into a landscape garden with "beautiful inclosures descending in natural waving slopes from the house." Fairmile Cemetery, on a hillside southwest of the village, belongs to Henley Town Council.

References

Sources

External links

Assendon e-Museum

Villages in Oxfordshire